Chi Jang Yin (born in Guangzhou, China, 1973) is an American filmmaker, photographer, curator and educator. She is best known for her experimental films that explore displacement, alienation, the absence of representation, and narrative memory. Yin left China in the latter part of The Cultural Revolution. Her mother, an artist from an aristocratic family, first led the family to Taiwan, and then to Canada. Yin received her undergraduate and graduate degrees at The School of the Art Institute of Chicago, where she studied with Yvonne Rainer and Shellie Fleming. She was the Head of Media Art at the Department of Art, Media, and Design at DePaul University. Currently, Yin is an associate professor at The School of Cinematic Arts at the Jarvis College of Computing and Digital Media. Her research methodology focuses on intersectionality, information literacy, and how digitalization of the arts and humanities can be a form of advocacy. In 2020, she was named the 2020-2021 Presidential Faculty Fellow at DePaul University. Yin is a trained facilitator at The National SEED Project on Inclusive Curriculum, founded by Peggy McIntosh and has received certifications in negotiation from the executive education programs at the Harvard Law School and Northwestern University.

Experimental film
Chi Jang Yin's experimental films have been featured at numerous galleries, museums, and film festivals including The Los Angeles Film Festival, The Amsterdam International Documentary Festival in the Netherlands (IDFA), The Metropolitan Museum of Art, Kassel Dokumentarfilm-und-Videofest in Germany, European Media Arts Festival, Osnabrouck (Germany), The Contemporary Center of Art in Bulgaria, The Rome Independent Film Festival in Italy, The BWA Contemporary Art Gallery in Katowice, Poland, The Cheekwood Art Museum, The Phoenix Art Museum, The National Museum of Women in the Arts, The Gene Siskel Film Center, and The Pacific Film Archive at the University of California, Berkeley.

Filmography and awards 
 Another Clapping (2000) - Best of Film Festival, Thaw International Film and Digital Media Festival, Iowa City, IA. 2003, Best Documentary Short, Georgetown Independent Film Festival, Washington, DC. 2001, Finalist Award, Asian American Film and Video Showcase, Chicago, IL. 2001
 Untitled Affair (2003) - Second Grand Prize Award, Athens International Film Festival, Ohio. 2003
 Glass House (2005) - Best Film on Architecture, Asolo Art Film Festival, Asolo city, Italy. 2007
 Icon (2005)
 For the Unseen (2007)
 Lighthouse (2009)  - Distinction Prize Award and Honorable Mention, IN-OUT Festival, the Laznia Centre for Contemporary Art (Centrum Sztuki Współczesnej Łaźnia), Poland. 2009
 Dark River (2010)
 Hannah and the Crystal Ball (2010)
 Pretend Nothing Happened (2011)
 Come Back to Me (2019)
 1984–1989–2014 (2019)
 I Was There, Part III (2021)

Permanent collections 
Stanford University, Palo Alto, CA (library)
Nagoya University, Film Library, Japan (library)
University of Iowa Library, Iowa City, IA (library)
University of Nevada, Reno (library)
Film Art Foundation, San Francisco
DePaul Art Museum, permanent collection, Chicago
Video Data Bank
The School of Art Institute of Chicago

Photography 
Yin's digital photography that explored the work of German Modernist architect, Helmut Bartsch, was featured in LensCulture in 2019.

Curatorial projects
In 2002, sponsored by Chicago Filmmakers, Chi Jang Yin curated a series of ten experimental 16-millimeter films and videos  in a program titled When Autobiography Is Not the First Person. In 2010, sponsored by The DePaul Art Museum, she curated a documentary film exhibition that featured Disorder by Huang Weikai.

References

External links
 
 

1973 births
Living people
Artists from Guangzhou
Chinese emigrants to the United States
DePaul University faculty
Educators from Guangdong